Goemon: Shin Sedai Shūmei! is an action platforming game in the Ganbare Goemon series released for the PlayStation on December 20, 2001 in Japan. Developed by Konami Computer Entertainment Tokyo and Now Production, it is a futuristic spin-off of the original Ganbare Goemon series starring new characters who inherit the namesakes of the original cast in a more modern setting.

In February 2002, a companion game -- Goemon: New Age Shutsudō! -- was released for the Game Boy Advance. While this game shares the same general story and aesthetics as the original, it features a rewritten script, new level layouts, and various modifications from the Playstation game.

Notes

References 

PlayStation (console) games
Game Boy Advance games
2001 video games
Ganbare Goemon games
Japan-exclusive video games
Video games developed in Japan

Single-player video games